Khushbu is an Indian politician and actress.

Khushbu may also refer to:

 Khushbu (poetry), a 1976 volume of poetry
 Khushbu Thakkar, an Indian actress

See also
 Khushboo (disambiguation)